Camano may refer to:

 Camano Island, located in the U.S. state of Washington
 Camano, Uruguay
 Camano, American steamboat built in 1906 which sank in 1917
 Camano-class cargo ship, a design of ship constructed for the U.S. Army towards the end of World War II.

See also
 Camaño
 Kamano Island, British Columbia, Canada